"Popular" is a song by American alternative rock band Nada Surf, released as the first single from their debut album, High/Low (1996), in May 1996. Each verse in "Popular" presents, in spoken-word format, sarcastic advice to teenagers taken from the book Penny's Guide to Teen-Age Charm and Popularity by American actress Gloria Winters.

The song reached number 11 on the US Billboard Modern Rock Tracks chart and propelled the album to number 63 on the Billboard 200. "Popular" was also a big hit in Iceland, topping the country's chart for two weeks, and in France, where it reached number 10 and received a Gold certification for sales of over 250,000. Additionally, the song reached the top 40 in New Zealand, Sweden, and the Wallonia region of Belgium.

Background and release
The whole song, except for the chorus, are parts made up from the 1964 teen advice book Penny's Guide to Teen-Age Charm and Popularity, written by Gloria Winters. The excerpts are spoken in a sarcastic tone by Matthew Caws.

"Popular" proved to be Nada Surf's most successful single. The song was originally scheduled to be serviced to US alternative radio on June 10, 1996, but its growing popularity prompted Elektra Records to move the release date forward to May 1996. Caws explained, "After the attention from 'Popular' died down, people seemed to get the impression that we'd somehow fallen from grace."

Nada Surf continue to perform the song live despite the stylistic difference from the band's later material. Caws commented in 2012, "We've tried playing 'Popular' at concerts now. If we don't play it, someone is grumpy. If we do play it, someone else is grumpy. We can't win."

Music video
The music video for the song, directed by Jesse Peretz, was shot at Bayonne High School, with administration approval, and showed football players and cheerleaders, wearing the uniforms of the school, as well as the three members of the band, Matthew as a teacher, Daniel as a security guard, and Ira as the football coach. The video was styled by Andrea Linett, a former editor at Sassy magazine, who went on to be the founding creative director of Lucky magazine.

The plot consists of a female cheerleader taking the teacher's lesson on popularity literally by two-timing two football players behind their backs, under the notion that she deserves "every boy in the whole world" by following that teacher's "teenage guide to popularity." The cheerleader in the music video was portrayed by then 18-year-old Sarah Sebestyen, a student at the time at Professional Children's School in Manhattan.

Track listings
European and Australia CD single
 "Popular" – 3:36
 "Pressure Free" – 2:32
 "Oh No" – 2:08

Australian CD single with slipcase
 "Popular"
 "Psychic Caramel"

Credits and personnel
Credits are adapted from the European-Australian CD single liner notes.

Studio
 Recorded at Electric Lady Studios (Greenwich Village, New York City)

Personnel

 Matthew Caws – writing
 Daniel Lorca – writing
 Ric Ocasek – production
 Catherine Talese – Popularspeak
 Bruce Calder – engineering

 George Marino – mastering
 Warren Entner – management
 Jim deBarros – art direction and design
 John Kelsey – cover photo

Charts and certifications

Weekly charts

Year-end charts

Certifications

Release history

Pom Pom Squad version
In December 2021, indie rock band Pom Pom Squad released a cover of "Popular," with Matthew Caws appearing on backing vocals. The accompanying video replicated the 1996 video shot for shot, with Pom Pom Squad's Mia Berrin playing each of the major characters. The video was filmed at the same location as Nada Surf's video.

References

Nada Surf songs
1996 debut singles
1996 songs
Elektra Records singles
Number-one singles in Iceland
Song recordings produced by Ric Ocasek
Music based on books